The St. Tammany Parish Sheriff's Office (STPSO) is the chief law enforcement agency of St. Tammany Parish, Louisiana. It falls under the authority of the Sheriff, an elected official who is the chief law enforcement officer of the parish.

The Sheriff

The sheriff of St. Tammany Parish is Randy Smith, Sheriff Smith was sworn in as Sheriff of St. Tammany Parish on July 1, 2016. He has over 28 years of experience in the field of law enforcement. He previously served as chief of police for Slidell, Louisiana.

Employees of the office are amongst the highest-paid in the region.

Facilities

The Sheriff's Office operates the following facilities:

Headquarters - The headquarters is located within the St. Tammany Parish Justice Center, at 701 North Columbia Street, in Covington.
St. Tammany Parish Jail - The St. Tammany Parish Jail is located at 1200 Champagne Street in Covington. Opened in 1985, the jail currently houses 872 inmates, and employs 207 people at full operation. The jail is operating under a Memorandum of Agreement with the US Dept of Justice.
Administration Building - Many of the agency's administrative divisions operate out of the complex at 300 Brownswitch Road, Slidell.
Training Center - The agency's training and education center is located on Pine Street in Pearl River.

Fallen officers
Since the formation of the St. Tammany Parish Sheriff's Office, four deputies have been killed in the line of duty. The most common cause of line of duty deaths to date is gunfire.

Corruption and Sexual Abuse Allegations
Former Sheriff Jack Strain has been accused and is currently being investigated(2019) by the FBI for alleged bribery and sexual abuse of minors both before and while in office.  Strain was arrested on June 11, 2019 for the allegations. He was found guilty on all charges of sexual crime on November 8, 2021 and awaits sentencing scheduled for January 18, 2022. Strain was sentenced to four consecutive life sentences without the opportunity of parole. He is currently serving his time at the State Prison in Homer, LA.

See also

 List of law enforcement agencies in Louisiana

References

External links
 St. Tammany Parish Sheriff's Office Website

Sheriffs' offices of Louisiana
St. Tammany Parish, Louisiana